= Flower stalk =

Flower stalk and fruit stalk may refer to:

- The pedicel of a single flower in an inflorescence
- The peduncle of an inflorescence or a solitary flower
  - Scape, a peduncle rising from the ground level
